DxO Labs (formerly DO Labs) is a privately owned photography software company. It was founded in 2003 by Jérôme Ménière, former CEO of Vision-IQ. The company's headquarters are in Paris, France.

It sells DxO PhotoLab, DxO PureRaw, DxO ViewPoint, DxO FilmPack, and Nik Collection image processing software packages.

History
DxO Labs created DxOMark.com, which provides image quality ratings for standalone cameras, lenses, and mobile devices that include cameras. However it has spun off from them, DxOMark Image Labs. On October 25, 2017, DxO announced the acquisition of the Nik Collection assets from Google.

Products

DxO PhotoLab 
First released as DxO Optics Pro in 2004, DxO PhotoLab is digital image editing software package designed for professional photographers. It offers automatic corrections for optical aberrations and image distortions for popular camera-lens combinations, as well as a range of other tools. It can be used in conjunction with other software such as Adobe Lightroom.

DxO ViewPoint 
DxO ViewPoint allows the user to correct perspective and lens distortions, especially those caused by shooting with wide-angle lenses when the subject is not in the middle of the frame.

DxO FilmPack 

DxO FilmPack emulates the appearance of various conventional films digitally.

Nik Collection 

Nik Collection is a collection of 8 plugins and applications compatible with Adobe Lightroom and Adobe Photoshop . DxO acquired Nik Collection from Google on October 25, 2017, who in turn had acquired it from Nik Software in 2012. Nik Collection was first released as a DxO product in 2018.

DxO Analyzer 
DxO Analyzer is a suite of software tools and equipment to test sensors, lenses, and standalone cameras, as well as mobile devices with cameras. Originally introduced by DxO Labs, DxO Analyzer is now a product of DxOMark Image Labs.

DxO ONE 
The DxO ONE was a phone-connected-camera. It was a small 20-megapixel, 1-inch-sensor, 1.8 camera which plugs into a Lightning connector of an iPhone or iPad and uses the display to frame and shoot an image. The camera was discontinued in 2018.

References

External links

 
 DxO Film Pack Review

Digital photography
Photo software
Software companies of France
Privately held companies of France
Photography companies of France